Alario is a surname. Notable people with the surname include:

John Alario (born 1943), American politician
Alario Center, a 2,400-seat multi-purpose aren
Lucas Alario (born 1992), Argentine footballer

Birds 
 Alario alario
 Alario leucolaemus